"Bounce, Rock, Skate, Roll" is a song by the American funk group Vaughan Mason & Crew that capitalized on the roller disco fad of the late 1970s.  Released in the summer of 1979, the single reached number 5 on the US Billboard Hot Soul Singles and number 38 on Billboard’s Disco Top 100 chart in 1980. It was inspired by the bassline in the song "Good Times" by Chic, also released in summer 1979.

It has since been used as the inspiration for the title of the film Roll Bounce, and appears on its soundtrack.

References

Songs about disco
1979 debut singles
1979 songs
Brunswick Records singles
Vaughan Mason & Crew songs
Sampled drum breaks